The Mingha River is a river of the Canterbury Region of New Zealand's South Island.

Together with Goat Pass, elevation , and the Deception River, the Mingha valley forms a route across the Southern Alps known as the Mingha/Deception. It is used for the mountain running segment of the annual Coast to Coast race.

See also
List of rivers of New Zealand

References

New Zealand 1:50000 topographic map sheet BV20 - Otira

Rivers of Canterbury, New Zealand
Arthur's Pass National Park
Rivers of New Zealand